Niv Antman (born 2 August 1992) is an Israeli footballer currently playing in Sektzia Ness Ziona.

Career
Antman, the son of veteran goalkeeper Giora Antman, played in his youth career in Maccabi Tzur Shalom and Maccabi Haifa, before moving to Hapoel Haifa. Antman graduated to the senior team in 2012 and got his break at the first team as replacement for an injured first goalkeeper Tvrtko Kale, playing 6 full matches during the 2013–14 season. In 2015, Antman returned to the team's starting lineup.

In 2011, Antman played two matches with the Israel U19 team, against Belarus.

References

1992 births
Living people
Israeli Jews
Israeli footballers
Hapoel Haifa F.C. players
Hapoel Rishon LeZion F.C. players
FC Dordrecht players
Ironi Nesher F.C. players
Hapoel Ra'anana A.F.C. players
Sektzia Ness Ziona F.C. players
Israeli Premier League players
Liga Leumit players
Eerste Divisie players
Expatriate footballers in the Netherlands
Israeli expatriate sportspeople in the Netherlands
Israel under-21 international footballers
Footballers from Kiryat Motzkin
Association football goalkeepers